Two ships of the Royal Navy have borne the name HMS Sunderland, after the English city of Sunderland, whilst another was planned:

 was a 60-gun fourth rate launched in 1694, hulked in 1715 and sunk as a foundation in 1737.
 was a 60-gun fourth rate launched 1724 and rebuilt in 1744. She foundered in 1761.
She was renamed  before her launch in 1943 and was sold in 1948.

Royal Navy ship names